Syzygium nidie is a species of flowering plant in the family Myrtaceae, native to Vanuatu and Fiji. A hardwood tree reaching , it is harvested commercially for its timber.

References

nidie
Flora of Fiji
Flora of Vanuatu
Plants described in 1931